Larion Serghei (11 March 1952 – 5 November 2019) was a Romanian sprint canoeist, who competed in doubles together with Policarp Malîhin. They won a bronze medal at the 1976 Olympics and two medals at the 1975 World Championships.

References

External links

 

1952 births
2019 deaths
Canoeists at the 1976 Summer Olympics
Romanian male canoeists
Olympic canoeists of Romania
Olympic bronze medalists for Romania
Romanian people of Russian descent
Olympic medalists in canoeing
ICF Canoe Sprint World Championships medalists in kayak
Medalists at the 1976 Summer Olympics